Minho was a former province in Portugal, established in 1936 and dissolved in 1976. It consisted of 23 municipalities, with its capital in the city of Braga. Today, the area would include the districts of Braga and Viana do Castelo. Minho has substantial Celtic influences and shares many cultural traits with neighbouring Galicia in Northwestern Spain. The region was part of the Roman Province and early Germanic medieval Kingdom of Gallaecia. Historical remains of Celtic Minho include Briteiros Iron Age Hillfort, the largest Gallaecian native stronghold in the Entre Douro e Minho region, in North Portugal.  The University of Minho, founded in 1973, takes its name from the former province.

Minho is famous as being the origin of the soup caldo verde and Vinho Verde, a wine particular to the region.

Historic cities 

 Braga (Bracara Augusta)
 Guimarães (old Vimaranes).
 Viana do Castelo, formerly Viana do Lima.
 Barcelos
 Fafe

See also 

 Minho River
 Gallaecia
 Ave Subregion
 Peneda-Gerês National Park

Provinces of Portugal (1936–1976)
Wine regions of Portugal
States and territories disestablished in 1976
States and territories established in 1936
1936 establishments in Portugal
1976 disestablishments in Portugal